Aayiram Kaliamman Temple is an ancient temple in Tirumalairayanpattinam (T.R.Pattinam). The temple is much famous for the main deity, Goddess Kaliamman's statue is made up of wood.

History

According to legend, a devotee belonging to Senguntha Mudaliar caste dreamt that he collects a box with an idol of Goddess Kaliamman on the seacoast. The next day he really found a silver box with an idol on the seacoast, along with an palm leaf inscription. The palm leaf inscription indicated that this deity has to be worshipped with 1000 items daily.

But the community decided to conduct pooja for once in 5 years, as performing pooja with 1000 ritualistic object daily is impossible. During the Tamil month of Vaikasi (May–June), the festival is conducted for every 5 years.

Festival

Every five years, a special pooja is performed with 1000 items. This special pooja at Aayiramkaliamman Temple attracts devotees from all over Tamil Nadu and Puducherry.

Goddess idol
The goddess is entirely made of wood. Every part of her body is kept individually in a wooden box.

References

Hindu temples in Puducherry
Karaikal district